West Dallas is an area consisting of many communities and neighborhoods in Dallas, Texas, United States. West Dallas is the area bounded by Interstate 30 on the south, the Trinity River on the east and north, and the Trinity River's West Fork on the west.

Demographics
In the late 1980s, the neighborhood had a population of 13,161. As of the 2000 U.S. census, there were 24,132 people living in the neighborhood. The racial makeup of the neighborhood was 2.7% White, 37.3% African American, 0.6% Native American, 2.4% Asian or Pacific Islander, 41.8% from Hispanic or Latino, and 15.2% from two or more races.

Neighborhoods
One of the city's up-and-coming areas for urban revitalization, West Dallas is seeing new developments emerge. They include:
 Trinity Groves, on Singleton Boulevard
 Sylvan/Thirty, on Fort Worth Avenue
 Alta West Commerce
 Alta Yorktown
 Cliff View (West of Sylvan and north of Fort Worth Avenue)

These developments are bringing top-tier chefs, yoga studios, fresh-food markets, hip retail and apartments and condos with views of the downtown Dallas skyline, the Margaret Hunt Hill Bridge and the Margaret McDermott Bridge.

Other newer residents of West Dallas include the Belmont Hotel; the restaurant/bar complex Chicken Scratch/The Foundry; The Workroom, the SPCA of Texas, Dead White Zombies theater company, Salon Las Americas event center and MetroPaws Animal Hospital, among many others.

Long-standing neighborhoods in West Dallas prior to gentrification of the community include: 

 Bickers Park
 Buena Vista
 Cement City
 Cross Hampton
 Cross Westmoreland, Dallas
 Commerce Heights
 College Park (Riggins)
 Colonia Tepeyac, Dallas
 Coombs West End
 Crossman Ave
 Gilbert-Emory
 Ledbetter/Eagle Ford, Dallas 
 Fish Trap Projects
 Greenleaf Village
 Homestead Manor
 El Aceite (mistakenly written as "La L'aceate"), Dallas|El Aceite
 La Bajada
 La Estrella, Dallas|La Estrella
 La Loma, Dallas|La Loma
 La Mexicanita
 La Reunion (Texas)|La Reunion
 Lake West
 Ledbetter Gardens
 Los Altos
 Muncie, Dallas|Muncie
 P J Allen No 3
 Rupert Circle, Dallas|Rupert Circle Projects
 Victory Gardens
 Weisenberger Lucky 7
 Western Heights, Dallas|Western heights
 Westmoreland Heights
 Westmoreland Park

WEST DALLAS HOUSING PROJECTS: located near HAMPTON RD & SINGLETON BLVD. this development dates back to the early 1950s. It consisted of three separate developments, segregated by race (Blacks, Hispanics and Whites). The names of the developments were: GEORGE LOVING PLACE, EDGAR WARD PLACE & ELMER SCOTT PLACE.

Industrial sections
 Lone Star Industrial Park
 Singleton Industrial Area
 Turnpike Distribution Center

Education

Public Education
Public education in West Dallas is provided by Dallas and Irving Independent School Districts, as well as a public charter school from Uplift Education and two private schools. Dallas schools cover over 90% of the area — only areas on the north side of the original channel of Westmoreland and on the west side of the original channel of Mountain Creek attend Irving schools. (See: Channeling of the Trinity River)

All students zoned to Dallas ISD Schools attend Thomas A. Edison Middle Learning Center and L. G. Pinkston High School, as well as one of the following elementary schools:

 C. F. Carr Elementary School
 Sequoyah Learning Center (Demolished for L. G. Pinkston new site)
 Dallas Environmental Science Academy (Now housed in the former Amelia Earhart)
 George W. Carver Learning Center (Demolished for L. G. Pinkston new site)
 Amelia Earhart Elementary School (Closed)
 Benito Juarez (Closed)
 Fredrick Douglas (Closed)
 Priscilla Tyler (closed and purchased by West Dallas Community School)
 Lorenzo DeZavala Elementary School
 Sidney Lanier Elementary School Vanguard for Expressive Arts
 Eladio R. Martinez Learning Center
 Gabe P. Allen Elementary School
 West Dallas STEM School

All students zoned to Irving schools attend Bowie Middle School and Nimitz High School. Students living on the north side of the original channel of the West Fork of the Trinity River attend Schulze Elementary School and students living on the west side of the original channel of Mountain Creek attend Townley Elementary School.

Students in West Dallas may also attend Uplift Heights Preparatory, a college preparatory, non-selective, but lottery-based public charter school located in the Lake West neighborhood of West Dallas.  As of August 2015, Uplift Heights serves slightly more than 1,700 Pre-Kindergarten through 11th grade students.  Uplift Heights will have its first graduating class in 2017. Uplift Heights Preparatory has been open since 2006 and is part of Uplift Education.

Private Education

 Mayo Kindergarten, a Christian Private School, formerly located in Eagle Ford in the 5500 block of Fannie Street. Mrs. Sammie Lee Crump, was the owner and operator of the school and it was the first Black owned school in West Dallas.
 West Dallas Community School, a Christian private school, is in West Dallas.
 St. Mary of Carmel Catholic School, established in 1944, is located at 1716 Singleton Boulevard in the heart of West Dallas.

Post-Secondary Education
 Dallas College West Dallas Center.

Other Educational Centers and Resources

 Voice of Hope Ministries, a Christian Out-of-School time program founded in 1982 is in West Dallas. They provide after school and summer programming for the children of West Dallas.
 Wesley-Rankin Community Center
 Readers To Leaders
 Mercy Street

Environmental history
West Dallas originated as a community on the outskirts of Dallas. The community was founded in 1886. In 1909 the Thomas A. Edison School was built. Murphy Metals (later known as RSR Corporation), a secondary lead smelter processing company, opened a  facility and in 1934 started operations at the site. The process of secondary lead smelting melts the collected lead materials or, lead scrap, into metallic lead that can then be used to cast into molds. Significant lead emissions can occur from poorly controlled refining, casting, and drossing operations. The city of Dallas annexed West Dallas into the city limits in 1954. Before that year, many residents lived in an area lacking the basic services because they resided outside the city lines. Then in 1956 a 3,500-unit public housing complex was to be built just north of the RSR lead smelter facility. In 1968 the City of Dallas enacted an ordinance prohibiting more than 5 micrograms per cubic meter over a 30-day period. This act went unenforced because in the 1960s RSR Corp West Dallas facility released more than 269 tons of lead particles into the air each year. During that time few residents could afford the luxury of air conditioning, so in the summers they kept their doors and windows open to combat the heat, directly exposing them to the toxins in the air, even in their own homes. It wasn't until 1972 that Dallas officials learned that lead could be finding its way into the bloodstreams of children who lived in West Dallas and the bordering community of East Oak Cliff. The Dallas Health Department then conducted a study of their own. They found children living near smelters had elevated levels of lead. Lead was able to reach their bloodstream through the air, soil and households in and around their living environments. In areas near smelters children had a 36 percent increase in blood lead levels. The city failed to take immediate action and in 1974 the city sued local smelters. The company agreed to pay $35,000 and install new pollution control equipment. This did little to resolve the problem because in 1983 the pollution equipment had still not been installed at RSR Corp. Pressure from the community on government agencies was beginning to rise. A citizens group appointed by the Dallas City Council, The Dallas Alliance Environmental Task Force, has this to say in a 1983 study “We believe the city had missed many opportunities to serve and protect the community at large and two neighborhoods in particular in relation to the lead problem we now address. It is clear that the State and Federal governments have also failed in their opportunity to regulate and industry of this type with regard to the general welfare of citizens.” Before that in 1981 public concern and pressure were raised after the West Dallas Boys Club had to suspend outside activity after one soil test showed the soil contained 36 times the level considered dangerous for children. The club was later forced to close in 1983 due to high lead levels related to the years of operations of the RSR secondary lead smelter operation. After lengthy test and lawsuits and delayed clean-up action, partially government agencies fault, RSR Corp. was ordered by the Dallas Board of Adjusters to close the West Dallas facility. In the summer of 1985 an out-of-court settlement was reached between RSR Corp. and Fred Baron who represented 370 children and 40 property owners who were all affected by the lead emitted from RSR. The settlement was for 20 million dollars. However, with this settlement the land that the old RSR Corp facility used to sit on still contained large amounts of lead contamination dangerous to all ages of people. In May 1993 a proposal of the RSR Corp. site in West Dallas was sent to the National Priorities List, also named a Superfund site President Clinton's administration then brought more publicity to the issue when in November 1993 an article written in The Progressive had this to say “West Dallas residents celebrated when the Clinton Administration declared last May that they live in the largest lead-contaminated Superfund site in the United States. Portions of one of the nation's biggest housing projects and five schools, all located within five square miles of a now-defunct lead smelter, are slated for cleanup (although Federal Environmental Protection Agency records indicate as much as sixteen square miles of West Dallas are contaminated)." For the residents who had been pushing for years and decades to solve the problem could lay their case to rest on September 28, 1994, when the EPA signed Preliminary Close Out Report for the RSR Corp. Superfund site stating all clean-up for all the units had been completed. The EPA then signed a Ready For Reuse document in May 2005 declaring the site ready for reuse or redevelopment The EPA reported that the clean-up resulted in direct lower lead blood leaves of children. The community also benefited by having 400 properties  of commercial property eliminated of contamination.

Government Agencies and Companies serving West Dallas
United States Postal Service Dallas Main Post Office is a processing center located at 401 Tom Landry Highway, Dallas, Texas, 75260. The Brookhollow Station services zip codes 75212 and 75247 which are home to West Dallas and the extension of West Dallas known as the Design District.

AT&T the landlines for West Dallas are serviced by two wire centers Dallas Melrose was originally telephone numbers beginning with 214-63X-XXXX which is considered the western portion of the community. Dallas Riverside was originally telephone numbers beginning with 214-74X-XXXX which is the eastern portion into Downtown Dallas.

Dallas Public Library West Dallas is served by the Dallas West Branch of the Dallas Public Library at 2332 Singleton Blvd.

West Dallas Multipurpose Center

Builders of Hope

Transportation

Bus 
 DART
 GoLink https://en.wikipedia.org/wiki/Dallas_Area_Rapid_Transit#GoLink

Light rail 
 DART
 West End Station
 Dallas Union Station known as the Eddie Berniece Johnson or EBJ Union Station
 Victory Station

Alternative Transportation
 West Dallas Circuit https://www.ridecircuit.com/westdallas

Highways 
 Interstate 30
 Interstate 35E
 Texas State Highway Spur 366
 Texas State Highway Loop 12
 Dallas North Tollway

Notable people
Depression-era celebrity criminals Clyde Barrow and Bonnie Parker both came from poverty out of West Dallas in the 1920s and 1930s.
First West Dallas African America City Council woman Mattie Lee Nash, known as the Mayor of West Dallas, fought tirelessly to better the West Dallas community was elected in 1991 and served one term.
Actress Regina Taylor is from West Dallas.
Rapper Tracy Lynn Curry musical name The D.O.C. hails from West Dallas. Although his career started in Los Angeles, he still calls West Dallas home.
Don Chief, as known as, Big Chief whose rap single "My Swag" featured Jim Jones is also from West Dallas.

References

External links
 Serve West Dallas
 West Dallas Chamber of Commerce
 Bill Harrod Memorial Baptist Church
 Brother Bill's Helping Hand